J. Douglas MacMillan (30 September 1933 – 3 August 1991) was a British Christian minister in the Free Church of Scotland.

Life
MacMillan was born the youngest of six children, on the Ardnamurchan peninsula in Argyll. He was converted at the age of 21, and studied at the University of Aberdeen and at the Free Church College. After his ordination, he ministered at St. Columba in Aberdeen (1966–1974) and St Vincent Street in Glasgow (1974–1982), before taking up an appointment as Professor of Church History at the Free Church College. Since 1994, the biennial MacMillan Lecture in Evangelism has been held at that institution in his honour.

According to Hywel Jones, MacMillan's preaching was marked by "powerful originality and strong orthodoxy". He is best known for his book The Lord Our Shepherd. This is an exposition of Psalm 23, originally given to the Evangelical Movement of Wales in 1979. MacMillan drew on his 12 years of experience as a shepherd to argue that the shepherd theme pervades the entire psalm.

MacMillan wrote a number of other books including Wrestling with God consisting of addresses on the life of Jacob given to the Evangelical Movement of Wales in 1983, Jesus: Power Without Measure, Restoration in the Church and The God of All Grace.

MacMillan had five children with his wife, Mary.

References

1933 births
1991 deaths
Converts to Presbyterianism
20th-century Ministers of the Free Church of Scotland
Alumni of the University of Aberdeen
People from Lochaber
Historians of Christianity
20th-century  Scottish historians
British historians of religion